Whatever You Want – The Very Best of Status Quo is a two-disc compilation album by English rock band Status Quo, released in 1997. In 2005, the set was repackaged as Gold as part of the ongoing Universal Music series.

Track listing

Personnel 
 Francis Rossi – lead guitar, vocals
 Rick Parfitt – rhythm guitar, vocals
 Alan Lancaster – bass, vocals
 Roy Lynes – keyboards, vocals
 John Coghlan – drums, percussion
 Andy Bown – keyboards, rhythm guitar, harmonica, vocals
 Pete Kircher – drums, percussion, vocals
 John Edwards – bass, vocals
 Jeff Rich – drums, percussion

Charts

Certifications

References 

1997 compilation albums
Status Quo (band) compilation albums
Vertigo Records compilation albums
PolyGram compilation albums
Universal Music Group compilation albums
Gold series albums
2005 compilation albums